The Access Liberty keelboat was designed by Chris Mitchell, and was first launched by its Australian builders Access. The class is recognised by the International Sailing Federation.

World Champions

References

External links

Official 
 Official Access Liberty Class Association Website
  ISAF Access Liberty Microsite Website
  ISAF Homepage

Classes of World Sailing
Keelboats